The 1878-79 Scottish Districts season is a record of all the  rugby union matches for Scotland's district teams.

It includes the East of Scotland District versus West of Scotland District trial match.

History

Due to 9 weeks of frost there was no inter-city match played this season.

The East v West match was played; in quite soft ground. The kick-off was delayed, and the players found it tough to score. The match ended nil - nil.

Results

Inter-City

No match played.

Other Scottish matches

West of Scotland District: Robert Campbell MacKenzie (Glasgow Academicals), Malcolm Cross (Glasgow Academicals), P. Russell (West of Scotland), James Campbell (Glasgow Academicals), J. Nelson (Glasgow Academicals), Edward Ewart (Glasgow Academicals), John Blair Brown (Glasgow Academicals), Stewart Henry Smith (Glasgow Academicals), J. Colville (West of Scotland), Henry Melville Napier (West of Scotland), J. Cochrane (West of Scotland), J. Adam (West of Scotland), F. Buchanan (West of Scotland), Charles Stewart (West of Scotland), R. Drummond (Glasgow University)

East of Scotland District: J. C. Montgomery (Edinburgh Wanderers), Ninian Finlay (Edinburgh Academicals), Bill Maclagan (Edinburgh Academicals), William Masters (Edinburgh Institution F.P.), William Sorley Brown (Edinburgh Institution F.P.), Alexander Petrie (Royal HSFP), Errol Smith (Edinburgh Institution F.P.), Duncan Irvine (Edinburgh Academicals), J. Bannerman (Edinburgh Academicals), Nat Brewis (Edinburgh Institution F.P.), A. Ainslie (Edinburgh Institution F.P.), David Somerville (Edinburgh Institution F.P.), Thomas Ainslie (Edinburgh Institution F.P.), R. S. F. Henderson (Edinburgh University), N. G. Thomson (Red Cross Dundee)

English matches

No other District matches played.

International matches

No touring matches this season.

References

1878–79 in Scottish rugby union
Scottish Districts seasons